Luche reduction is the selective organic reduction of α,β-unsaturated ketones to allylic alcohols with sodium borohydride (NaBH4) and lanthanide chlorides, mainly cerium(III) chloride (CeCl3), in methanol or ethanol. The Luche reduction can be conducted chemoselectively toward ketone in the presence of aldehydes or towards α,β-unsaturated ketones in the presence of a non-conjugated ketone.

An enone forms an allylic alcohol in a 1,2-addition, and the competing conjugate 1,4-addition is suppressed.

The selectivity can be explained in terms of the HSAB theory: carbonyl groups require hard nucleophiles for 1,2-addition. The hardness of the borohydride is increased by replacing hydride groups with alkoxide groups, a reaction catalyzed by the cerium salt by increasing the electrophilicity of the carbonyl group. This is selective for ketones because they are more Lewis basic.

In one application, a ketone is selectively reduced in the presence of an aldehyde. Actually, in the presence of methanol as solvent, the aldehyde forms methoxy acetal that is inactive in the reducing conditions.

References

Organic reduction reactions
Organic redox reactions
Name reactions